Causeway GAA is a hurling team in Ireland.

Honours
 Kerry Senior Hurling Championship (9): 1932, 1979, 1980, 1981, 1982, 1987, 1998, 2019, 2022
 Kerry Intermediate Hurling Championship (1): 2021
 Kerry Junior Hurling Championship (1): 2021
 Kerry Minor Hurling Championship (2) 1968, 1977
 Kerry Under-21 hurling championship (4) 1979, 2014. 2015, 2017
 North Kerry Senior Hurling Championship (3) 1988, 2003, 2010

County Championship Winning captains

1932: Neilus Flynn
1979: Roger Hussey
1980: Roy Dineen
1981: Maurice Leahy
1982: Gerald O'Grady
1987: Anthony O'Connor
1998: Maurice O'Carroll
2019: Muiris Delaney
2022: Jason Diggins

Notable players
Maurice Leahy
Keith Carmody
John Mike Dooley
Neilus Flynn
David Clifford
Paudie Clifford
Colm Cooper

References

External links
Official Causeway GAA Club website

Gaelic games clubs in County Kerry
Hurling clubs in County Kerry